The A42 is a major trunk road in the East Midlands region of the United Kingdom. It links junction 23A of the M1 motorway to junction 11 of the M42 motorway. The A42 is in effect a continuation of the M42, and its junctions are numbered accordingly.

It is built to a similar standard to the M42, being a grade separated dual carriageway. The  Measham and Ashby-de-la-Zouch bypass section was opened in August 1989 at a cost of £33m.

Junctions

Bridging link
The A42 was built by the UK Government in 1989 to link the northern section of the M42 to the M1.  Although it is not designated as motorway, and has no hard shoulder, the road is fully grade separated and runs with two lanes each way, the same as the M42 to the south.

The original planned line of the M42 saw it joining the M1 further to the north, crossing what is now the A50 Derby Southern Bypass and meeting the M1 north of Bardills Island (A52/M1 interchange).

Service stations
Donington Park services

History of the road number

The current road is the second incarnation of the A42.  The original (1923) route was Reading to Birmingham via Oxford.  The whole road was renumbered in 1935 – the section from Reading to Shillingford became part of the A329, Shillingford to Oxford became part of the A423 and Oxford to Birmingham became part of the A34. In 1993 the A423 was itself renumbered, with the section formerly the A42 becoming part of the A4074 from Reading to Oxford. The modern M42 does interchange with the former A42 at junction 4 near Solihull: Stratford Road now being numbered A34 to the north of the junction and A3400 to the south.

See also
Anomalously numbered roads in Great Britain.

References

External links

SABRE Roaders Digest – A42
Road to Nowhere: A42
Sky Vault website
BBC news article on Sky Vault

Roads in England
Transport in Leicestershire